The Rivière de Saint-Marc is a river of Haiti.

See also
List of rivers of Haiti

References
GEOnet Names Server

Rivers of Haiti